The Air Force Financial Services Center (AFFSC) is a Field Operating Agency of the United States Air Force.  The center is located at Ellsworth Air Force Base in Rapid City, South Dakota.  Its mission is to centrally process all military pay and travel pay transactions for the Air Force, and to answer financial services questions from Air Force personnel 24 hours a day, 7 days a week.  The commander of the Air Force Financial Services Center reports to the Deputy Assistant Secretary of the Air Force for Financial Operations in The Pentagon.

History
The Financial Services Center was opened on 14 September 2007 by Secretary of the Air Force Michael Wynne.  The ribbon-cutting ceremony was attended by United States Senator John Thune, Congresswoman Stephanie Herseth Sandlin, senior Air Force official, and Rapid City civic leaders. The center's first commander was Colonel Judy Perry.

The Air Force selected Ellsworth Air Force Base as the site for its finance center from more than 80 candidate locations. In addition, the area's cost of living, low risk for natural disasters, and generally friendly atmosphere also were considered in the site selection decision.

Personnel
An initial cadre of approximately 50 non-commissioned officers, arrived in April 2007. When fully manned, the center had 775 Airmen and civilian employees.  The current personnel makeup is 80 percent military and 20 percent civilian.  However, the Air Force plans to slowly shift the manning mix to achieve a majority civilian work force by 2014. All military personnel assigned to the center are trained for contingency operations and support expeditionary Air Force deployments.

Facilities
 The center consists of three buildings located on Ellsworth Air Force Base.  The main building houses the financial transaction processing operations group and the customer service contact center (which will be officially activated in October 2008).  This building was originally the base military education and testing center.  The finance center also includes a separate state-of-the-art technology facility and a small military headquarters building adjacent to the main building. This building was the base community center prior to being gutted and remodeled.

Financial Operations
Activation of the Financial Services Center was the largest financial management transformation initiative in Air Force history. The Air Force consolidated financial services into a single center to increase efficiency and reduce operating costs needed to deliver the financial services to Airmen.  The center's centralized transaction processing and customer service contact center reduces these tasks from 93 base finance offices located at Air Force installations around the world.  This reduced the total number of Air Force personnel needed to process pay transactions and respond to customer inquires by 600.

The center is modeled on private sector customer service operations.  Its streamlined transaction processing will save the Air Force $210 million in basic operating costs over a ten-year period.

Contact center personnel are trained to resolve a multitude of common finance issues. This allows Air Force personnel to make inquiries and resolve pay issues at the customer's convenience.  More complicated pay matters are routed to the appropriate department within the center so functional experts can research and resolve the problem. This approach ensures each problem is effectively addressed.

References

External links
 United States Air Force
 Assistant Secretary of the Air Force (Financial Management and Comptroller)
 Ellsworth Air Force Base

United States Air Force
Field operating agencies of the United States Air Force
Centers of the United States Air Force
Military in South Dakota
United States military pay and benefits